Disambiguation Note:  This article is about the son of F. Curtis Dohan.

Francis Curtis Dohan Jr. (November 10, 1935 — November 16, 2021) was an American physician and neuropathologist.

Birth and education
Dohan Jr. was born in Philadelphia, Pennsylvania. His father, Francis Curtis Dohan, was a research physician and endocrinologist.  His mother, Marie Postenrieder Dohan, was a sociologist (PhD, Bryn Mawr College).

In 1957 he graduated from Princeton University, where investor Carl Icahn and author Robert Caro were classmates, and where he majored in physics.  The physics department at that time was influenced by its relationship with Albert Einstein.

Dohan Jr. graduated from Harvard Medical School in 1961.  Nobel laureate J. Michael Bishop was a classmate during Dohan's first year in medical school, and Olympic figure skating champion Tenley Albright was a classmate for four years. Dohan went on to complete an internship and residency in internal medicine at Bellevue Hospital in New York City, before becoming a research associate at the National Institutes of Health in Bethesda, Maryland.

In 1968 he returned to Boston to work in the laboratory of Nobel laureate John F. Enders at Children's Hospital. In 1977 he began residency training in pathology at the Massachusetts General Hospital. He completed neuropathology training at Boston Children's Hospital in 1983.

Medical career
In 1984 Dohan Jr. became Director of Neuropathology at the University of Tennessee, College of Medicine in Memphis, a position he held for a quarter of a century and through which he helped to train a generation of physicians specializing in neurosurgery, neurology, and pathology.

As a medical researcher Dohan Jr. published many scientific articles, and he inspired his students and colleagues to undertake important research projects.  His special interests included brain tumors, paraneoplastic disorders, and epilepsy.

Honors
 Princeton University, Physics Achievement Award (1954) 
 Harvard Medical School National Scholarship (1957) 
 University of Tennessee Neurosurgery Resident Teaching Award (1986)

References

External links
Researchers - Alumni, Massachusetts General Hospital Neurosurgery
Appointments in Massachusetts General Hospital Neurosurgery – Alumni (1972–1977)
Fellows and Staff - Alumni MGH Neurosurgery (1972–1977)

1935 births
Living people
Physicians from Philadelphia
American neuroscientists
Princeton University alumni
Harvard Medical School alumni
University of Tennessee faculty